is a railway station on the Yamada Line in the city of Miyako, Iwate, Japan, operated by the East Japan Railway Company (JR East).

Lines
Moichi Station is served by the Yamada Line, and is located 87.0 kilometers from the terminus of the line at Morioka Station. It was also a terminal station for the Iwaizumi Line, until its operations were suspended on 31 July 2010 due to a landslide, and the line was closed on 1 April 2014, due to very low public demand.

Station layout
Moichi Station has a one island platform and two tracks. connecting to station building by a footbridge. The station is Unstaffed from 2018.

Platforms

History
Moichi Station opened on 6 November 1934. The Iwaizumi Line began operations from 25 June 1942. The station was closed from 26 November 1946 to 5 March 1949.

The station was absorbed into the JR East network upon the privatization of the Japanese National Railways (JNR) on 1 April 1987.

Operations on the Iwaizumi Line were suspended on 31 July 2010, due to a landslide, and the line was officially closed on 1 April 2014, with services replaced by buses.

Passenger statistics
In fiscal 2015, the station was used by an average of 53 passengers daily (boarding passengers only).

Bus routes
Higashinihon Kotsu
For Iwaizumi bashi
For Miyako Station
Niisato Community Bus
For Hikime Station
For Kyu-Kariya Station
For Haratai Station
Northern Iwate Transportation
For Morioka Station
For Miyako Station

Surrounding area
Moichi Station is a small station deep in the mountains.
  National Route 106 
  National Route 340

See also
 List of railway stations in Japan

References

External links

  

Railway stations in Iwate Prefecture
Yamada Line (JR East)
Railway stations in Japan opened in 1934
Miyako, Iwate
Stations of East Japan Railway Company